This is a list of National Football League players with a career total of over 15,000 all-purpose yards.

Players listed in bold currently active.

List

See also
List of National Football League records (individual)
List of National Football League rushing yards leaders
List of National Football League receiving yards leaders

Notes

References

External links
Enumeration of career all-purpose yardage leaders from the Pro Football Hall of Fame
Pro-Football Reference

All-purpose yards leaders
National Football League lists